Rhamnose (Rha, Rham) is a naturally occurring deoxy sugar. It can be classified as either a methyl-pentose or a 6-deoxy-hexose. Rhamnose predominantly occurs in nature in its L-form as L-rhamnose (6-deoxy-L-mannose). This is unusual, since most of the naturally occurring sugars are in D-form. Exceptions are the methyl pentoses L-fucose and L-rhamnose and the pentose L-arabinose. However, examples of naturally-occurring D-rhamnose include some species of bacteria, such as Pseudomonas aeruginosa and Helicobacter pylori.

Rhamnose can be isolated from Buckthorn (Rhamnus), poison sumac, and plants in the genus Uncaria. Rhamnose is also produced by microalgae belonging to class Bacillariophyceae (diatoms).

Rhamnose is commonly bound to other sugars in nature. It is a common glycone component of glycosides from many plants. Rhamnose is also a component of the outer cell membrane of acid-fast bacteria in the Mycobacterium genus, which includes the organism that causes tuberculosis. Natural antibodies against L-rhamnose are present in human serum, and the majority of people seem to possess IgM, IgG or both of these types of immunoglobulins capable of binding this glycan.  

An interesting particularity of rhamnose is the absence of formaldehyde production when reacted with periodates in the vicinal diol cleavage reaction, that makes it very useful to remove excess periodate in glycerol or other vicinal diol analysis, that would otherwise give colored blank issues.

See also
 Galactose binding lectin domain, despite the name, often binds rhamnose
 Alpha-L-rhamnosidase

Disaccharides:
 Rutinose, rhamnose-glucose 
 Neohesperidose, rhamnose-glucose
 Robinose, rhamnose-galactose

Polysaccharides:
 Gellan gum -glucose-glucuronic acid-glucose-rhamnose-
 Welan gum

Glycosides:
 :Category:Rhamnosides
 Echinacoside
 Rhamnolipid
 Verbascoside

References

Further reading
 

Deoxy sugars
Aldohexoses